This is a list of well-known persons who were either born in, or lived in, Tulsa, Oklahoma.

Arts
 Joe Brainard, (1942 - 1994) painter
 Charles Bell (1935–1995), artist
 Ted Berrigan, (1934 - 1983) poet
 James Pepper Henry, artist and Gilcrease Museum director (2015-2017)
 Roman Jasinski, (1907- 1991) ballet dancer and teacher
 Ron Padgett, (b. 1942) poet

Business
Frank Abagnale, fraud expert, former con man, subject of Catch Me If You Can
Cyrus Avery (1870–1963), businessman and "father of Route 66"
Bill Bartmann, businessman, named as "One of the Top 100 Entrepreneurs of the Last 100 Years"
W. Tate Brady (1870–1925), businessman, owner of the Brady Hotel
James A. Chapman (1881–1966), oilman and philanthropist
Robert Galbreath Jr.  (1863–1955), oilman who moved to Tulsa after he drilled the first oil well in Glenn Pool Field
J. Paul Getty (1892–1976), oilman founder of Getty Oil Company, who made his first million in Tulsa between 1914 and 1916
Thomas Gilcrease (1890–1962), oilman, founder of Gilcrease Museum
J. M. Hall (1851–1935), pioneer merchant in Tulsa, organized First Presbyterian Church
George Kaiser, chairman of BOK Financial Corporation
Henry Kravis, co-founder of Kohlberg Kravis Roberts & Co.
Joseph A LaFortune, (1894–1975), oilman and philanthropist
James H. McBirney (1870–1944), co-founder and president National Bank of Commerce in Tulsa
Sam P. McBirney (1877–1936), football coach and co-founder National Bank of Commerce in Tulsa
Robert M. McFarlin (1866–1942), oilman and philanthropist
Waite Phillips (1883–1964), oilman and philanthropist
Harry Ford Sinclair (1876–1956), founder of Sinclair Oil, co-founder of Exchange National Bank (later part of National Bank of Tulsa and Bank of Oklahoma; convicted of jury tampering during Teapot Dome scandal trial
 Carolyn Mary Skelly (1905–1996), eccentric daughter of William Grove Skelly; oil heiress; dubbed the most robbed woman in the U.S. by the Boston Globe; socialite; hosted fundraisers for President George H.W. Bush, and Texas Governor John Connally
William G. Skelly (1877–1957), founder of Skelly Oil Company, Spartan Aircraft Company and Spartan School of Aeronautics, philanthropist
William K. Warren Sr. (1897–1990), founder of Warren Petroleum Corporation; philanthropist
John Smith Zink (1928–2005), engineer, owner of John Zink Industries, automobile racer

Music
Admiral Twin (Mark Carr, Jarrod Gollihare, John Russell, Brad Becker), rock band
The Agony Scene, metalcore band
Elvin Bishop, blues and rock music singer-songwriter, guitarist and bandleader
Garth Brooks, country music singer
Broncho, punk rock band with Ryan Lindsey, Johnathon Ford of Roadside Monument, and Nathan Price
Anita Bryant, singer
J. J. Cale, songwriter and musician, an originator of The Tulsa Sound
Capital Lights, pop rock band
Rodney Carrington country music singer and comedian
Jeff Carson, country musician
Chuck Cissel, singer and dancer
Annie Clark (St. Vincent)
Roy Clark, country musician
David Cook, 2008 American Idol winner
Denny Cordell, record producer, signed Tom Petty as part of Mudcrutch
Ester Dean, singer-songwriter
Joe Diffie, country musician
Phil Driscoll, trumpet player and singer, Christian and jazz musician
Ronnie Dunn (Brooks and Dunn)
 Annie Ellicott, jazz, swing singer
Scott Ellison, electric blues guitarist, singer and songwriter
Ester Drang, indie band
Rocky Frisco, pianist for J.J. Cale; 2008 inductee into Oklahoma Blues Hall of Fame
The Gap Band, Charlie, Ronnie and Robert Wilson, R&B, funk, and soul band
David Gates, pop rock musician (Bread)
Hanson, Isaac, Taylor and Zac Hanson, Pop rock band
Gus Hardin, female country musician
Jacob Fred Jazz Odyssey, jazz band
William Johns, opera singer
Jim Keltner, drummer for the Traveling Wilburys
Tosca Kramer (1903–1976), violinist, violist, and music educator
Fredell Lack (1922–2017), violinist
Lega-C, rapper
Leon McAuliffe, steel guitarist Bob Wills And His Texas Playboys
Little Joe McLerran, singer, guitarist, recording artist and winner of 2009 International Blues Challenge
John Moreland, singer-songwriter
Jamie Oldaker, drummer, Eric Clapton, Bob Seger
Patti Page, singer
PDA, rapper
Pillar, band
Johnny Polygon, rapper
Carl Radle, musician, bassist for Derek and the Dominos
Ben Rector, singer-songwriter
Steve Ripley, engineer, producer, singer-songwriter and guitarist for The Tractors and Bob Dylan
Leon Russell, singer-songwriter, pianist, guitarist, an originator of The Tulsa Sound and founder of The Church Studio
SafetySuit, pop rock band
Jacob Sartorius, born in Tulsa but adopted and moved to upstate Virginia shortly after his birth
Natalie Sims, musician, songwriter and music executive
Andy Skib, guitarist, keyboardist in David Cook's band
Clyde Stacy, rockabilly musician
Ryan Tedder, producer, songwriter, lead singer of OneRepublic
David Teegarden, rock drummer with Teegarden & Van Winkle and with Bob Seger
Flash Terry, blues musician
Neal Tiemann, lead guitarist in David Cook's band
Wayman Tisdale (1964–2009), jazz musician and former professional basketball player
Dwight Twilley, poper pop, rock musician
Jared Tyler, singer-songwriter and producer
Unwed Sailor, instrumental indie rock
David T. Walker, session guitarist, famous for his work with Jackson 5, Bobby Womack, Levert and Stevie Wonder among others
Johnnie Lee Wills, western music band leader, brother of Bob Wills
Charlie Wilson, R&B singer and lead singer of The Gap Band
Bob Wootton, lead guitarist for the Tennessee Three
Tuck Andress, guitarist
Kristin Chenoweth, actress, singer and author
Dara Tucker, singer-songwriter and documentary filmmaker
AleXa, K-pop Idol

Politics
Tom Adelson, member of the Oklahoma State Senate
Bob Ballinger, member of the Arkansas House of Representatives, reared in Tulsa
Dewey F. Bartlett, former Governor of the state of Oklahoma and U.S. Senator
Dewey F. Bartlett Jr., former Mayor of Tulsa (2009–2016)
G. T. Bynum, Mayor of Tulsa (2016–present)
Jim R. Caldwell, retired Church of Christ minister and former member of the Arkansas State Senate
David Duke, former Grand Wizard of the Ku Klux Klan and former member of the Louisiana House of Representatives 
David Hall, former Governor of the state of Oklahoma
James Inhofe, U.S. Senator 
James R. Jones, former member of the U.S. House of Representatives, chairman of the American Stock Exchange
Frank Keating, former Governor of the state of Oklahoma
John Albert Knebel, Secretary of Agriculture in the Carter Administration
Sheila Kuehl, former actress, now California State Senator
Steve Largent, former member of the U.S. House of Representatives
Willian F. Martin, United States Deputy Secretary of Energy
Jim McConn, former Mayor of Houston, Texas, 1979–1981
Daniel Patrick Moynihan, former Democratic U.S. Senator representing New York was born in Tulsa.
George E. Nowotny, retired Tulsa businessman and former member of the Arkansas House of Representatives from Fort Smith
John A. Sullivan, member of the U.S. House of Representatives
Kathy Taylor, Mayor of Tulsa (2006–2009)
John Volz, attorney for the U.S. District Court for the Eastern District of Louisiana, died in Tulsa in 2011
R. James Woolsey Jr., former director, Central Intelligence Agency
Terry Young, former Mayor of the City of Tulsa

Print
Mildred Grosberg Bellin, Jewish cookbook author
Denver Nicks, journalist 
William Bernhardt, mystery/suspense fiction author
Daniel J. Boorstin (1914-2004), historian and writer; former Librarian of Congress
P.C. Cast, author
John Hope Franklin, African American historian; namesake of John Hope Franklin Reconciliation Park in Tulsa
Martin Gardner, author of works on philosophy, mathematics and literature
Sterling Gates, comic book writer (Supergirl, Action Comics)
S.E. Hinton, author (The Outsiders, That Was Then, This Is Now, Tex) 
Mercedes Lackey, science-fiction author
R.A. Lafferty, science-fiction author
Billie Letts, author, Where the Heart Is
Tracy Letts, Pulitzer Prize-winning playwright and actor (August: Osage County)
Joe McGuff, journalist and newspaper editor
Russell Myers, cartoonist, Broom-Hilda comic strip
Dan Piraro, cartoonist of the Bizarro comic strip
William P. Steven, journalist and newspaper editor 
Clifton Taulbert, author, Once Upon a Time When We Were Colored
Will Thomas, mystery fiction author
Mildred Ladner Thompson, reporter for The Wall Street Journal and Tulsa World
Michael Wallis, author, Route 66, Pretty Boy Floyd, Mankiller, Billy the Kid Voice Of Sheriff in The Cars Series
K. D. Wentworth, science-fiction author
Cornel West, theologian, author
Joy Harjo, poet, musician, and author. First Native American Poet Laureate, and first Poet Laureate from Oklahoma.

Radio
Paul Harvey (1918–2009), radio personality
Roy D. Mercer, fictional radio character

Screen and stage

Pamela Bach, actress; ex-wife of David Hasselhoff
Marshall Bell, actor
William Boyd, aka Hopalong Cassidy, western actor (born in Hendrysburg, Belmont County, Ohio)
Max Burnett, TV writer, screenwriter and director
Gary Busey, actor
Cindy Chupack, screenwriter for Sex and the City
Larry Clark, film director and photographer
Iron Eyes Cody, actor
Jay Dee, comedian
Larry Drake, actor
Blake Edwards, film director
Sue England, actress
Bill Hader, actor, writer and comedian
Sterlin Harjo, filmmaker
Josh Henderson, actor
John Ingle, actor 
Eva Jinek, news anchor
Jennifer Jones (1919–2009), actress
Heather Langenkamp, actress
Tommy Morrison, boxer and actor
Jerry Nelson, actor, puppeteer
Tim Blake Nelson, actor and director
Mary Kay Place, actress
Tony Randall, actor
Julián Rebolledo, actor and voice talent
Jack Roberts, actor
Gailard Sartain, actor
Mary Stuart, actress
Wes Studi, actor
Paula Trickey, actress
Jeanne Tripplehorn, actress
Stacy Valentine, porn star
Amber Valletta, actress and supermodel
Susan Watson, Broadway actress
Alfre Woodard, actress
Judy Woodruff, television journalist
Don Woods, meteorologist

Sports

Brent Albright, professional wrestler
Kelenna Azubuike, professional basketball player
Randy Blake, kickboxer
Bill Blankenship, football coach, head coach at University of Tulsa
Anthony Bowie, basketball player
Michael Bowie, former Seattle Seahawks offensive tackle
Jordan Brailford, defensive end for the Atlanta Falcons
Dylan Bundy, baseball pitcher for the Minnesota Twins
Mikey Burnett, mixed martial artist
Patrick Callan, competitive swimmer
Dale Cook, kickboxer and actor
Bobby Cox (born 1941), player, manager and Baseball Hall of Famer
Richard Dumas, professional basketball player for the Phoenix Suns
Ebi Ere, basketball player for Melbourne Tigers
Terrance Ferguson, basketball player for the Philadelphia 76ers
Justin Fuente, head football coach, Virginia Tech
Reuben Gant, football player for Buffalo Bills 
Matt Gogel, professional golfer
Bill Goldberg (born 1966), professional NFL football player and undefeated wrestler
Todd Graham, head coach of Tulsa Golden Hurricane football team (2007–2010)
Matt Grice, mixed martial arts fighter
Tommy Hanson, baseball pitcher
Chris Harris Jr., NFL, Cornerback
Gerald Harris, mixed martial artist
Thomas Hatch, pitcher for the Toronto Blue Jays
Marques Haynes, Harlem Globetrotters player, Basketball Hall of Famer
David Heath, mixed martial artist
Randy Heckenkemper, golf course designer
Daxton Hill, NFL, Safety
Justice Hill, NFL, Running back
Koyie Hill, Major League Baseball catcher
Josh Jacobs, NFL, Running back
Zach Jackson (pitcher, born 1994), Major League Baseball, pitcher for the Oakland Athletics
Felix Jones, Dallas Cowboys Running back
Dallas Keuchel, pitcher for the Chicago White Sox
Jim King, NBA player and Tulsa Golden Hurricane men's basketball coach
Jeff Krosnoff, Championship Auto Racing Teams driver
Steve Largent, Seattle Seahawks wide receiver, Pro Football Hall of Famer, politician
Kevin Lilly, NFL player
Kevin Lockett, NFL player
Tyler Lockett, NFL player
Zach Loyd,  soccer player
Lee Mayberry, professional basketball player for the Milwaukee Bucks
Sam P. McBirney, coach of Tulsa Golden Hurricane football (1914–1916)
R. W. McQuarters, professional football cornerback
Robert Meachem, New Orleans Saints wide receiver
Kenny Monday, Olympic gold medalist in freestyle wrestling
Joe-Max Moore, soccer forward, U.S. Soccer Hall of Fame 2013
Reece Morrison, NFL player
Tommy Morrison (1969-2013), boxer, heavyweight contender and actor, Rocky V
Ray Murphy, Jr., collegiate wrestler and 1989 Handicapped Person of the Year
Charlie O'Brien, professional baseball catcher
Janice O'Hara, All-American Girls Professional Baseball League player
Peter Ramondetta, professional skateboarder
Nolan Richardson (born 1941), basketball coach for University of Tulsa and University of Arkansas, coach and general manager WNBA's Tulsa Shock
 Henry Schichtle, football player
 Tubby Smith (born 1951), basketball coach at Texas Tech University; former coach of University of Tulsa, University of Georgia and University of Kentucky
 John Starks, professional basketball player for the New York Knicks
 Iciss Tillis, professional basketball player for WNBA's Washington Mystics
 James "Quick" Tillis, boxer, heavyweight contender and actor
 Wayman Tisdale (1964–2009), professional basketball player and musician
 Matt Wiman, mixed martial arts fighter
 Darryl Wren, gridiron football player
 John Smith Zink, automobile racing

Religion
 Finis Alonzo Crutchfield, Jr., (1916–1986), United Methodist Church bishop, minister of Boston Avenue United Methodist Church, died in Tulsa
 Paul Vernon Galloway (1904–1990), Minister of Boston Avenue United Methodist Church, later Methodist bishop
 Willie George, children's show actor and pastor
 Charles William Kerr (1875–1951), first permanent Protestant minister in Tulsa
 Carlton Pearson (born 1953), evangelist
 Oral Roberts (1918–2009), pioneer televangelist, founder of Oral Roberts University, affiliated with United Methodist church
 Mother Grace Tucker (1919-2012), Evangelical Christian pastor and philanthropist
 John B. Wolf (1925–2017), minister of All Souls Unitarian Universalist Church

Other
 Bobby Baldwin, professional poker player (1978 world champion) and casino executive; born in Tulsa
 Deborah Barnes, judge of the Oklahoma Appellate Court (1987-present); daughter in law of the late Justice Don Barnes 
 Don Barnes (judge), born in Tulsa, Justice of the Oklahoma State Supreme Court (1972-1985)
 Jennifer Berry, Miss America 2006
 Butler, Phillip N., the eighth longest-held US prisoner of war in North Vietnam, president of Veterans for Peace
 Roscoe Cartwright, first black Field Artilleryman promoted to Brigadier General.
 Mike Doonesbury, main character in Garry Trudeau's comic strip Doonesbury
 Viola Fletcher, survivor of the Tulsa race massacre
 John Duncan Forsyth (1887–1963), architect
 W. R. Holway (1893–1981), engineer, designer of Spavinaw water project
 Robert Lawton Jones (1925–2018), architect noted for his contributions to modern architecture
 Olivia Jordan, Miss World America 2013, Miss Oklahoma USA 2015, Miss USA 2015
 Joseph R. Koberling, Jr. (1900–1990), architect
 Charles Page (1860–1926), philanthropist and founder of Sand Springs
 Leon B. Senter (1889-1965), architect
 William Angie Smith (1894–1974), Methodist Bishop of Oklahoma
 Mother Grace Tucker, pastor and philanthropist

References

 
Tulsa
Tulsa, Oklahoma